Lochington is a rural locality in the Central Highlands Region, Queensland, Australia.

Geography
Lochington is bounded to the east and south-east by the Nogoa River. The locality is within the Fitzroy River drainage basin.

The Capricorn Highway passes through the northernmost part of the locality from Anakie Siding to Willows.

The Snake Range National Park is within the east of the locality.

The predominant land use is grazing on native vegetation.

History
Lochington pastoral station obtained a mail service on 1 January 1937.

Lockington Provisional School opened 23 January 1961 on land that was once part of Lockington pastoral station. It became Lockington State School at a new site in January 1965. The school closed 14 December 1979 due to low student numbers. On 29 January 1991, Lochington State School was reopened (but with a new spelling of the name).

On 17 April 2020, the Queensland Government re-drew the boundaries of localities within the Central Highlands Region by replacing the locality of The Gemfields with three new localities of Rubyvale, Sapphire Central and Anakie Siding (around the towns of Rubyvale, Sapphire, and Anakie respectively). As a consequence of these changes, the boundary between Lochington and Minerva/Gindie more closely follows the course of the Nogoa River.

Education
Lochington State School is a government co-educational primary (P-7) school at the Lochington pastoral homestead off the Glenlee Road. In 2013, the school had 3 students (from the same family) and 1 teacher. In 2016, enrolment was 10, in 2017, eight, and in 2018, seven. In 2021, enrolment was six, including three students in their Prep year.

References

Further reading
 

Central Highlands Region
Localities in Queensland